Globicephalinae is a subfamily of oceanic dolphins that includes the pilot whales (Globicephala spp.), the pygmy killer whale (Feresa attenuata), the rough-toothed dolphin (Steno bredanensis), the false killer whale (Pseudorca crassidens), the melon-headed whale (Peponocephala electra), Risso's dolphin (Grampus griseus), and the snubfin dolphins (Orcaella spp.).

References

Oceanic dolphins